Christopher Birdwood Roussel Sargent (舒展; 4 June 1906 – 8 August 1943) was a schoolmaster, missionary, and bishop of the Anglican Church.

Sargent was born into an ecclesiastical family on 4 June 1906, the son of Church of England priest Douglas Harry Grose Sargent. He was educated at St Paul's School and St Catharine's College, Cambridge, then worked as a schoolmaster teaching physics at Wellington College until 1932.  At the invitation of Charles Ridley Duppuy, Bishop of Victoria, Hong Kong, in 1932 he became the headmaster of the Diocesan Boys' School, Hong Kong. He was ordained as a deacon in 1934 and took up the post of assistant bishop of the Diocese of Fukien in 1938; he was consecrated by Ronald Hall, Bishop of Victoria. He became diocesan bishop of the same diocese, the Bishop in Fukien, in 1940. Sargent died of malaria in Foochow on 8 August 1943.

Materials for a biography of Reverend Sargent were collected by Reverend Robert W. Howard.

References

1906 births
People educated at St Paul's School, London
Alumni of St Catharine's College, Cambridge
Hong Kong educators
Anglican missionary bishops in China
1943 deaths
Christian missionaries in Fujian
Deaths from malaria
English Anglican missionaries
British expatriates in China
20th-century Anglican bishops in China
Anglican bishops in Fukien